Mehr davon! Die Single-Box (More of it!) is a single box by the German punk band Die Toten Hosen. It contains some of the more important singles from 1995-2004, 1996-2005 or 1995-2002, depending on the version. The 2001 release Mehr davon! Die Single-Box 1995-2000 partly crosses over with this release and also has different variations.

Variations

1995-2004
CD1: "Nichts bleibt für die Ewigkeit"
CD2: "Zehn kleine Jägermeister"
CD3: "Unsterblich"
CD4: "Bayern"
CD5: "Was zählt"
CD6: "Kein Alkohol (ist auch keine Lösung)!"
CD7: "Frauen dieser Welt"
CD8: "Ich bin die Sehnsucht in dir"

1996-2005
CD1: "Zehn kleine Jägermeister"
CD2: "Unsterblich"
CD3: "Bayern"
CD4: "Was zählt"
CD5: "Kein Alkohol (ist auch keine Lösung)!"
CD6: "Frauen dieser Welt"
CD7: "Ich bin die Sehnsucht in dir"
CD8: "Alles wird vorübergehen"

1995-2002
CD1: "Nichts bleibt für die Ewigkeit"
CD2: "Paradies"
CD3: "Zehn kleine Jägermeister"
CD4: "Alles aus Liebe (live)"
CD5: "Schön sein"
CD6: "Unsterblich"
CD7: "Warum werde ich nicht satt?"
CD8: "Kein Alkohol (ist auch keine Lösung)!"

Track listings

Nichts bleibt für die Ewigkeit (1995)
 "Nichts bleibt für die Ewigkeit" (Nothing stays for infinity) (von Holst, Frege/Müller, von Holst, Frege) − 4:10
 "Alkohol" (Alcohol) (Rohde/Frege) − 2:03
 "Prominentenpsychose" (Celebrity psychosis) (Frege/Frege) – 3:14
 "Die '7' ist alles" (The '7' is everything) (Meurer/Frege) − 5:12

Paradies (1996)
 "Paradies" (Paradise) (Frege/Frege) − 3:59
 "Ein Witz" (A joke) (Meurer/Frege) - 2:55
 "Entenhausen bleibt stabil" (Duckburg remains stable) (Breitkopf/Müller) - 3:25
 "I'm the Walrus" (Lennon–McCartney) − 3:06 (The Beatles cover)

Zehn kleine Jägermeister (1996)
 "Zehn kleine Jägermeister" (roughly Ten little hunters/Jägermeisters) (Rohde/Müller, Frege) − 4:21
 "We Love You" (Jagger/Richards) − 3:10 (The Rolling Stones cover)
 "Der König aus dem Märchenland" (The king from the fairytale land) (Breitkopf/Frege) − 4:15

Alles aus Liebe (live) (1997)
 "Alles aus Liebe" (All out of love) (Frege/Frege) − 4:10
 "Lügen" (Lies) (von Holst/Frege) − 4:03
 "Seelentherapie" (Soul therapy) (Breitkopf/Frege) − 4:38

Schön sein (1999)
 "Schön sein" (To be beautiful) (Frege, van Dannen/Frege, van Dannen) − 3:12
 "You're Dead" (von Holst/Frege, Smith) – 4:41
 "Fußball" (Football) (von Holst/Frege) – 2:09
 "Im Westen nichts Neues" (All quiet on the Western front) (Breitkopf/Frege) – 1:59

Unsterblich (2000)
 "Unsterblich" (Immortal) (Frege, von Holst/Frege) − 3:46
 "Wofür man lebt (Dub-Version)" (What for one lives) (von Holst, Meurer/Frege) − 3:22
 "Psycho" (Roslie/Roslie) − 1:44 (The Sonics cover)

Bayern (2000)
 "Bayern" (Tipp-Kick Version) (Bavaria) (van Dannen, Frege/van Dannen, Frege) − 4:19
 "Laß doch mal Dampf ab" (Let some steam off for once) (/Fred Weyrich) – 2:24 (Gert Fröbe cover)
 "You'll Never Walk Alone" (Richard Rodgers/Oscar Hammerstein) - 2:36
 "Hang On Sloopy" (Ferrell, Russolt) - 2:30 (The McCoys cover)

Warum werde ich nicht satt? (2000)
 "Warum werde ich nicht satt?" (roughly Why don't I get enough?) (Breitkopf, von Holst/Frege) − 3:28
 "Babylon's Burning" (Jennings, Ruffy, Owen, Fox) − 4:25 (The Ruts cover)
 "Should I Stay or Should I Go?" (Mick Jones/Joe Strummer) − 2:43 (The Clash cover)

Was zählt (2001)
 "Was zählt" (What counts) (Breitkopf, von Holst/Frege) − 4:37
 "Hängt ihn höher" (Hang it higher) (Meurer/Frege) - 2:37
 "Drüber reden" (Talking about it) (von Holst/Frege) – 1:42
 "Schöner warten" (Nicer waiting) (Frege/Frege) – 3:58

Kein Alkohol (ist auch keine Lösung)! (2002)
 "Kein Alkohol (ist auch keine Lösung)!" (No alcohol (is also no solution)!) (Frege, Meurer, van Dannen/Frege, van Dannen) − 3:49
 "Wie man Kaninchen macht" (How one makes rabbits) (Frege, Meurer/Frege) - 3:57
 "Im Meer" (In the sea) (Breitkopf, von Holst/Frege) – 3:42

Frauen dieser Welt (2002)
 "Frauen dieser Welt" (Women of this world) (van Dannen/van Dannen) - 3:50 (Funny van Dannen cover)
 "Junge Menschen, alte Menschen" (Young people, old people) (van Dannen/Frege, van Dannen) - 3:07
 "Trauriges Arschloch" (Sad asshole) (Funny van Dannen) - 2:52 (with Funny van Dannen; Funny van Dannen cover)

Ich bin die Sehnsucht in dir (2004)
 "Ich bin die Sehnsucht in dir" (I am the longing in you) (von Holst/Frege, Weitholz) − 4:03
 "Es geht auch ohne" (It's okay without) (Meurer/van Dannen, Frege) - 2:07
 "Niemandslied" (No one's song) (van Dannen, Frege/van Dannen, Frege) - 2:24
 "Fallen" (Falling) (Breitkopf/Frege) - 3:30

Alles wird vorübergehen (2005)
 "Alles wird vorübergehen" (Everything will go by) (von Holst/Frege) − 3:11
 "Alles wird vorübergehen - J.C's Dubbed 2 Death-Mix" - 4:28
 "Rockaway Beach" (Dee Dee Ramone) - 1:59 (Ramones cover)

Personnel
Campino - vocals
Andreas von Holst - guitar
Michael Breitkopf - guitar
Andreas Meurer - bass
Wolfgang Rohde - drums
Vom Ritchie - drums

2005 compilation albums
Die Toten Hosen compilation albums